Atelier de Production et de Création, or A.P.C., is a French ready-to-wear brand founded in 1987 by the Tunisian Jewish fashion designer Jean Touitou in Paris.

History
In 1987, Jean Touitou created a clothing line which would later become the A.P.C. brand. The clothes from this first menswear collection wear labels that only mention “HIVER 1987”. It was only in 1989 that the labels referring to the seasons are replaced with A.P.C. labels, confirming the creation of the brand.

In 1993, the brand opened several international stores in Tokyo Daikanyama in 1991 and New York Mercer Street.

The first pieces of the A.P.C. collections were characterized by minimalist designs, clean lines, and simple patterns. The collection would later include raw Japanese denim. Touitou's co-designer, Louis Wong, has a small line of high-end jackets, Louis W., under the A.P.C. umbrella.

In 2011, designer Jessica Ogden launched the first collection of A.P.C. quilts, elaborated with fabric remnants as well. When Vanessa Seward joined A.P.C. in 2012, she was given first a capsule collection, and then eventually her own women’s wear line. In 2018, the brand’s first sneaker line was launched.

A.P.C. is also starting to organize parades and since 2018 they have been included in the official calendar of the Fédération française de la couture.

In 2023, A.P.C. agreed to sell a majority stake for an undisclosed sum to investment firm L Catterton, forming a strategic partnership to grow the brand internationally.

Collaborations 
A.P.C. has done collaborations with brands and creatives including Kanye West (2013), Outdoor Voices (2016), Kid Cudi (2019), Suzanne Koller (2019), Brain Dead (2019), Carhartt WIP, RTH, Catherine Deneuve, Charlotte Chesnais, and Goop (2020).

Campaigns
Past A.P.C. campaigns have been styled and photographed by Carine Roitfeld (1995), Bruce Weber (2008), Stella Tennant and Collier Schorr (2016).

References

External links 

Clothing companies of France
French brands
Clothing brands
High fashion brands
Companies based in Paris